Roeschel-Toennes-Oswald Property, also known as the Oswald Farm and Boyce Property, a historic home located at Boonville, Cooper County, Missouri. The original section was built in the 1850s-1860s and tool its present form in 1905.  It is a one- and two-story, frame and brick I-house form dwelling with Queen Anne design influences.  It features a projecting two-story bay and shingled gables with returns.

It was listed on the National Register of Historic Places in 1983.

References

Houses on the National Register of Historic Places in Missouri
Queen Anne architecture in Missouri
Houses completed in 1905
Houses in Cooper County, Missouri
National Register of Historic Places in Cooper County, Missouri
1905 establishments in Missouri
I-houses in Missouri
Boonville, Missouri